The Norwegian Football Association Gold Watch is an honorary proof that's awarded to all Norwegian footballers who reaches 25 caps for the Norway national football team. The watch is awarded by the Norges Fotballforbund. Gunnar Andersen was the first player to reach this milestone, when he was capped for the 25th time on 29 June 1919.

The Gold Watch was introduced in 1930, when the four players with 25 caps, (Gunnar Andersen, Per Skou, Einar Gundersen and Adolph Wold) were awarded the Gold Watch during a banquet at the Grand Hotel in Oslo.

In total, 163 male players have received the gold watch, the most recent being Haitam Aleesami, who received the award after Norway's Euro 2020 qualifying match against Sweden on 8 September 2019.

Recipients
Players in bold are still active.

Footnotes
[a] The players age when making his 25th appearance.

References

Norway national football team
Norwegian football trophies and awards
Norwegian sports trophies and awards
Awards established in 1930